Loan servicing is the process by which a company (mortgage bank, servicing firm, etc.) collects interest, principal, and escrow payments from a borrower.  In the United States, the vast majority of mortgages are backed by the government or government-sponsored entities (GSEs) through purchase by Fannie Mae, Freddie Mac, or Ginnie Mae (which purchases loans insured by the Federal Housing Administration (FHA) or guaranteed by the Department of Veterans Affairs (VA)).  Because GSEs and private loan investors typically do not service the mortgage loans that they purchase, the bank who sells the mortgage will generally retain the right to service the mortgage pursuant to a master servicing agreement.

The payments collected by the mortgage servicer are remitted to various parties; distributions typically include paying taxes and insurance from escrowed funds, remitting principal and interest payments to investors holding mortgage-backed securities (or other types of instruments backed by pools of mortgage loans), and remitting fees to mortgage guarantors, trustees, and other third parties providing services. The level of service varies depending on the type of loan and the terms negotiated between the servicer and the investor seeking their services, and may also include activities such as monitoring delinquencies, workouts/ restructurings and executing foreclosures.

In exchange for performing these activities, the servicer generally receives contractually specified servicing fees and other ancillary sources of income such as float and late charges. Mortgage servicing became "far more profitable during the housing boom", and some servicers targeted borrowers "less likely to make timely payments" in order to collect more late fees.

Overview
Servicers (servicing companies) are normally compensated by receiving a percentage of the unpaid balance on the loans they service.  The fee rate can be anywhere from one to forty-four basis points depending on the size of the loan, whether it is secured by commercial or residential real estate, and the level of service required. Those services can include (but aren't limited to) statements, impounds, collections, tax reporting, and other requirements.

Companies recognize servicing rights as distinct assets or liabilities when ownership of those rights is contractually separated from ownership of the underlying loan. The value recognized for servicing rights is based on the net present value of the expected cash flows received from servicing less the amount that would be required to adequately compensate a servicer (this incorporates an expected cost of servicing plus a profit margin required by market participants). The value of servicing assets or liabilities is highly interest-rate sensitive due to the relationship between interest rates and expected prepayments (i.e., loan refinancing). This is because when a loan is refinanced the servicing fees and other benefits of servicing cease, making the value of these assets extremely volatile.  For this reason, companies that hold large amounts of servicing rights tend to hedge the value of those servicing rights using interest rate sensitive derivative instruments such as interest rate swaps and swaptions.

In order for these companies to exist, they need to utilize software.  There are many loan servicing software companies and they tend to focus on a specific industry, such as community development financial institution (CDFIs), commercial loans, residential loans, and multi-family loans. To provide these solutions vendors work with companies and design the systems around their complexities.  Some of these systems can be thousands of programs and can be considered some of the most complex software systems ever built.

Companies involved

Wells Fargo, PNC Financial Services, Bank of America, JPMorgan Chase, Ocwen Financial Corporation are examples of large companies involved in the loan servicing industry.

See also 
Loan origination
Primary servicer

References 

Mortgage
Loans